Ahmadabad-e Do may refer to:
 Ahmadabad-e Do, Kerman
 Ahmadabad-e Do, Rayen, Kerman County